Indagator is a genus of flowering plants belonging to the family Malvaceae.

Its native range is Northeastern Australia.

Species:
 Indagator fordii Halford

References

Brownlowioideae
Malvaceae genera